Sematophyllaceae is a family of mosses, known commonly as signal mosses. They grow on rocks in wet or humid places. and are found nearly worldwide, especially in tropical and temperate regions. There are about 150 species, which form yellow to yellow-green mats with reddish stems.

Genera

The family Sematophyllaceae contains the following genera:

Acanthorrhynchium 
Acroporium 
Allioniellopsis 
Aptychopsis 
Billbuckia 
Brittonodoxa 
Chionostomum 
Clastobryella 
Clastobryophilum 
Colobodontium 
Donnellia 
Hydropogon 
Macrohymenium 
Meiotheciella 
Meiothecium 
Microcalpe 
Papillidiopsis 
Paranapiacabaea 
Potamium 
Pterogoniopsis 
Piloecium 
Radulina 
Rhaphidostichum 
Schraderella 
Schroeterella 
Sematophyllum 
Timotimius 
Trichosteleum 
Trolliella 
Vitalia 
Warburgiella

References

Hypnales
Moss families